is a junction passenger railway station located in the city of Yokosuka, Kanagawa, Japan, operated by the private railway operator Keikyū.

Lines
Horinouchi is served by the Keikyū Main Line and Keikyū Kurihama Line. It is located 52.3 rail kilometers from the northern starting point of the Keikyū Main Line at Shinagawa Station, in Tokyo and is the starting station for the Keikyū Kurihama Line.

Station layout
The station consists of two elevated island platforms serving four tracks, connected to the station building by an underpass.

Platforms

History
The station opened on April 1, 1930 as a temporary stop on the Shōnan Electric Railways. At that time, it was named , and was located 200 meters closer to Yokosuka-Chūō Station than the present station. In June 1936, it was elevated in status to a full station. In November 1941, the Shōnan Electric Railways and the Keihin Electric Railways merged, and in May 1942 became part of the Tokyu Corporation. The station was relocated to its present address in November 1942. In 1948, the Keihin Electric Express Railway became independent of the Tokyu Corporation. The station assumed its present name on September 1, 1961.

Keikyū introduced station numbering to its stations on 21 October 2010; Horinouchi Station was assigned station number KK61.

Passenger statistics
In fiscal 2019, the station was used by an average of 12,254 passengers daily. 

The passenger figures for previous years are as shown below.

Surrounding area
 Yokosuka Fruit and Vegetable Market
 Kasuga Shrine
 Yokosuka Miharu Post Office
 Yokosuka City Yamazaki Elementary School
 Yokosuka Emergency Medical Center

See also
 List of railway stations in Japan

References

External links

 

Railway stations in Kanagawa Prefecture
Keikyū Main Line
Keikyū Kurihama Line
Railway stations in Yokosuka, Kanagawa
Railway stations in Japan opened in 1930